Kulur or Kuloor is a locality in Mangalore city, Karnataka, India. Kulur is one of the major commercial junctions in the city. It is the gateway of Mangalore City South. To the north there is Gurupura river. It connects the northern parts of city like Surathkal, Kulai, Baikampady, Panambur to the eastern parts like Airport, Bajpe, Kavoor, Bondel, Maryhill, Vamanjoor & to the southern parts like Kottara, Bejai, MG Road, Statebank, Pumpwell, Thokottu, Ullal, Deralakatte, Konaje. The River Festival of Mangalore was held at Kulur along with Bangrakulur & Tannirbhavi. The district administration & Mangalore City Corporation proposed of building a permanent jetty at Kulur, to promote the backwater tourism of Mangalore along Gurupura River. The Kulur-Tannirbhavi corridor will be developed as a major tourists attraction under the Smart City Project.

Schools & Colleges in Kulur 

 Kulur High School
 VIBGYOR Roots and Rise, Kulur
 AJ Institute of Engineering & Technology.

References

Localities in Mangalore